Carol Hay is a Canadian executive producer. She is a winner of 6th Canadian Screen Awards for the Canadian television drama series Murdoch Mysteries: Once Upon a Murdoch Christmas.

References

Living people
Year of birth missing (living people)
Canadian producers
Place of birth missing (living people)